Dudi Sela was the defending champion, but chose to compete at the 2014 Delray Beach International Tennis Championships.

Golubev won the title, defeating Gilles Müller in the final, 6–4, 6–4

Seeds

Draw

Finals

Top half

Bottom half

References 
 Main draw
 Qualifying draw

Astana Challenger - Singles